Church of the Assumption and Rectory is a historic church and rectory at 204 SW 8th Street in Topeka, Kansas. The church was built in 1924 and added to the National Register in 2008.

The Assumption Rectory was completed in 1929 and is an example of Renaissance Revival style.

References

Churches in the Roman Catholic Archdiocese of Kansas City in Kansas
Churches on the National Register of Historic Places in Kansas
Renaissance Revival architecture in Kansas
Mission Revival architecture in Kansas
Roman Catholic churches completed in 1924
Churches in Topeka, Kansas
National Register of Historic Places in Topeka, Kansas
Houses on the National Register of Historic Places in Kansas
20th-century Roman Catholic church buildings in the United States